Palleon is a genus of small chameleons erected in 2013 for a small clade formerly assigned to the genus Brookesia.  The species of Palleon are endemic to Madagascar.

Species
 Palleon lolontany Raxworthy & Nussbaum, 1995
 Palleon nasus (Boulenger, 1887) – elongate leaf chameleon
 Palleon nasus nasus
 Palleon nasus pauliani

References

 
Lizard genera
Taxa named by Frank Glaw
Reptiles of Madagascar
Endemic fauna of Madagascar